Qaral (Hispanicized spelling Caral, also spelled Karal, Kjaral, K'aral) is a  mountain in the Bolivian Andes. It is situated in the Potosí Department, Nor Lípez Province, Colcha "K" Municipality. Qaral lies south of the Uyuni salt flat, south-west of the mountain Lliphi. Some of the nearest villages are Santiago and San Juan (San Juan del Rosario). An intermittent stream named Urqu Sunqu (Quechua for mountain heart, Orkho Sonkho) originates at the mountain. It flows to the south-west.

References 

Mountains of Potosí Department